The NAACP Image Award winners for Activist of the Year.

References

NAACP Image Awards